Artery of bulb may refer to:

 Artery of bulb of penis
 Artery of bulb of vestibule